Hubert Owen Sprinkle (September 18, 1896 – December 11, 1961) was an American football tackle who played three seasons in the National Football League with the Akron Pros and Cleveland Bulldogs. Sprinkle first enrolled at the University of Missouri before transferring to Carnegie Mellon University. He attended Webb City High School in Webb City, Missouri.

References

External links
Just Sports Stats

1896 births
1961 deaths
Akron Pros players
American football tackles
Carnegie Mellon Tartans football players
Cleveland Bulldogs players
Missouri Tigers football players
People from Dade County, Missouri
People from Webb City, Missouri
Players of American football from Missouri